The Meteor goldfish is considered the rarest breed of goldfish. They are a tailless form thought to have been developed by goldfish breeders during the late 19th or early 20th century. The meteor goldfish lacked a tail fin, but had a well-developed anal fin in its position. The other fins of the meteor goldfish were elongated, and it was a competent swimmer despite its lack of a tail. Few swim like other normal goldfish and few swim straight ahead like a rocket, the rocket swimming being rarer. Whilst rare the meteor is also one of the hardest to breed, they can be very weak and in low temperatures sicken easily.

Because no photographs of the breed appear to exist, the Bristol Aquarists' Society has suggested that the meteor goldfish may simply be a rumor. It has been speculated to be related to the Egg-fish.

References

External links
 Purported photo of a meteor goldfish